Marc Douglas Salyers (born February 28, 1979) is an American retired professional basketball player. He played at the small forward and power forward positions.

College career
Salyers played college basketball at Samford University with the Samford Bulldogs from 1997 to 2001. In his senior season, he averaged 17.2 points per game.

Professional career
Salyers played his first two professional years with Cimberlo Novara of the Italian Legadue.

For the 2003–04 season, he moved to Turkey and signed with Oyak Renault. He was the top scorer of the 2003–04 TBL season, with average of 25.3 points per game. In April 2004, he moved for the remainder of the season to Élan Béarnais Pau-Orthez, and helped them to win the 2003–04 LNB Pro A season.

For the 2004–05 season he returned to Turkey and signed with Fenerbahçe. He averaged 16.6 points in 19 FIBA Europe League games and helped Fenerbahce to make it to that competition's semifinals.

During the 2005–06 season, Salyers played for four teams – BCM Gravelines of France, BG Leitershofen of Germany, the Busan Magicwings of South Korea and RB Montecatini Terme of Italy.

In the summer of 2006, he returned to France and signed with Chorale Roanne. In his first season with Roanne, he helped them to win both the French League and the Semaine des As titles, earning MVP honours in both occasions. In his second season with Roanne, he played great in EuroLeague. On November 14, 2007, he scored 40 points against his former team Fenerbahçe during a EuroLeague match. For his performances during the season, he was awarded with the Alphonso Ford EuroLeague Top Scorer Trophy, an annual award given to the EuroLeague's top scorer of the season.

On July 6, 2008, Salyers signed with Ukrainian club Azovmash Mariupol. The financial troubles of Azovmash have forced him to leave during the season. As a player of Azovmash he averaged 11.8 points and 4.5 rebounds in 12 games of the Ukrainian Superleague.

On July 18, 2009, Salyers signed with Le Mans Sarthe for the 2009–10 season.

On July 28, 2010, he signed with Italian club Angelico Biella for the 2010–11 Serie A season. In 30 games, he averaged 11.1 points and 4.6 rebounds per game.

The 2011–12 season, Salyers started playing with Sukhumi in the FIBA EuroChallenge qualifying round. In November 2011, he signed with Trabzonspor. He left Trabzon after appearing in seven games.

In August 2012, he signed with Al Mouttahed Tripoli of the Lebanese Basketball League for the 2012–13 season.

On October 23, 2013, Salyers signed with STB Le Havre of the French Pro A. On November 29, 2013, he parted ways with Le Havre after appearing in only three games. On December 30, 2013, he signed with BC Orchies of the LNB Pro B for the rest of the season.

References

External links
Euroleague.net profile
Eurobasket.com profile
FIBA.com profile
LNB Pro A profile 
TBLStat.net profile

1979 births
Living people
American expatriate basketball people in France
American expatriate basketball people in Georgia (country)
American expatriate basketball people in Italy
American expatriate basketball people in Lebanon
American expatriate basketball people in South Korea
American expatriate basketball people in Turkey
American expatriate basketball people in Ukraine
American men's basketball players
Basketball players from Chicago
BC Azovmash players
BCM Gravelines players
BC Orchies players
Suwon KT Sonicboom players
Élan Béarnais players
Fenerbahçe men's basketball players
Le Mans Sarthe Basket players
Montecatiniterme Basketball players
Oyak Renault basketball players
Pallacanestro Biella players
Power forwards (basketball)
Samford Bulldogs men's basketball players
Small forwards
STB Le Havre players
Sagesse SC basketball players